Elections to Reading Borough Council took place on 7 May 2015 to elect approximately one third of the members of Reading Borough Council in England to coincide with other local elections, an election which was held simultaneously with the 2015 General Election, resulting in higher turnout than the previous election. The election resulted in no change in terms of the political make-up of the Council will each political party holding their respective seats.

After the election, the composition of the council was:

Election result

Ward results

Note: The Liberal Democrats did not stand in this ward.

References

2015 English local elections
May 2015 events in the United Kingdom
2015
2010s in Berkshire